William Morgan (1862 – 22 October 1914) was a Welsh first-class cricketer.

Born at Nantgarw near Cardiff in 1862, Morgan made two appearances in first-class cricket, both for the West of England. Both matches came against the East in the East v West fixtures, with the first played at Portsmouth in September 1892, and the second played at the same venue in 1894. He took three wickets across the two matches. He later played minor counties cricket for Glamorgan in 1901 and 1902, making seven appearances in the Minor Counties Championship. He died at Porthleven, Cornwall, in October 1914.

References

External links
William Morgan at ESPNcricinfo
William Morgan at CricketArchive

1862 births
1914 deaths
Sportspeople from Rhondda Cynon Taf
Welsh cricketers
West of England cricketers
Glamorgan cricketers